10 Minutes 38 Seconds in This Strange World is a 2019 novel by Turkish writer Elif Shafak and her eleventh overall. It is a one-woman story about a sex worker in Istanbul. It was released by Viking Press in 2019.

Summary
10 Minutes and 38 Seconds in This Strange World opens in 1990 with "Tequila Leila", who is a prostitute. The story has her five outcast friends, who don't share a worthy importance in a liberal country. Leila enters the state of awareness in her last moments, after she has been murdered and left in a dumpster outside Istanbul. "While the Turkish sun rises above her and her friends asleep soundly nearby, she contemplates her mortal existence before eternal rest." In the last minutes she recalls her previous life; "the taste of spiced goat stew, sacrificed by her father to celebrate the long-awaited birth of a son; the sight of bubbling vats of lemon and sugar which the women use to wax their legs while the men attend mosque; the scent of cardamom coffee that Leila shares with a handsome student in the brothel where she works. Each memory, too, recalls the friends she made at each key moment in her life—friends who are now desperately trying to find her..."

Awards
Shortlisted for the 2019 Booker Prize.
The Blackwell's Book of the Year, 2019
Shortlisted for RSL Ondaatje Prize, 2020

References

2019 novels
Novels by Elif Şafak
Novels set in Istanbul
Turkish-language novels
Novels about prostitution
Novels about violence against women
Violence against women in Turkey
Novels set in the 1990s
Fiction set in 1990
Viking Press books